Tahirli may refer to:
 Tahirli, Akçakoca
 Tahirli, Jalilabad, Azerbaijan
 Tahirli, Yardymli, Azerbaijan